"Debbie" is the lead single from the compilation album Time Capsule: Songs for a Future Generation by The B-52's. The song was inspired by Debbie Harry of the band Blondie. The single's music video was directed by Ramaa Mosley.

Track listing
 "Debbie" (Edge Factor Club Mix) - 7:55
 "Debbie" (Edge Factor Instrumental) - 7:55
 "Debbie" (Tea Dance Dub) - 7:26
 "Debbie" (Album version) - 3:33

Charts

References

External links
 Debbie music video

1998 singles
The B-52's songs
Songs written by Fred Schneider
Songs written by Kate Pierson
Songs written by Keith Strickland
Songs written by Cindy Wilson
Reprise Records singles
1998 songs